The 2013 Special Olympics World Winter Games was a Special Olympics, a multi-sports event that was held in Pyeongchang, South Korea from January 29 through February 5, 2013. Though officially allocated to Pyeongchang, events were also held in Gangneung Indoor Ice Rink.

Venues 
The three venues and events are:
Yongpyong Ski Resort, alpine skiing 
Gangneung Indoor Ice Rink, ceremonies and figure skating
Alpensia Resort, everything else, including sales

Opening ceremony

The Games

Participating Special Olympic Committees

Notes

Sports
The 2013 Special Olympics World Winter Games programme featured 8 sports with encompassing many disciplines (in parentheses).

 Alpine skiing (9)
10M Walk
Advanced Giant Slalom
Advanced Super G
Glide
Intermediate Giant Slalom
Intermediate Super G
Novice Giant Slalom
Novice Super G
 Cross-country skiing  (10)
100M Race Classical
1K Divisioning Round
500M Race Freestyle
50M Race Classical
5K (7.5K & 10K) Divisioning
 Figure skating (5)
Ice Dancing
Ice Dancing Team
Pairs
Singles
Unified Pairs
 Floorball (1)
Team
 Floor hockey (3)
Team
Unified Team
 Short track speed skating  (9)
111M Race
111M Race (semi & Final)
222M Race
333M Race
500M Race
500M Race (Semi & Final)
777M Race
777M Race (Semi & Final)
1000 Race
1500M Race
25M Straight
55M Half LapSnowboarding
 Snowboarding (9)
Advanced Giant Slalom
Advanced Slalom
Intermediate Giant Slalom
Intermediate Slalom
Snowshoeing (10)
25M Race
50M Race
100M Race
200M Race
400M Race
800M Race
1600M Race
4X100M Relay
4X400M Race
5K Race

Calendar

Mascots
The mascots are Ra, In and Bow.

Nations 
Canada won the overall medal table. They won 109 medals (44 Gold, 44 Silver and 21 Bronze).

External links 

 Official Site

References 

Special Olympics
Special Olympics World Winter Games
International sports competitions hosted by South Korea
Sports competitions in Pyeongchang County
Sports competitions in Gangneung
Special Olympics World Winter Games
Multi-sport events in South Korea
2015 festivals in South Korea